Kvåsefjorden is an approximately  long fjord in Agder county, Norway. It forms part of the border between the municipalities of Lillesand and Kristiansand. The district of Randesund lies on the west side of the fjord in Kristiansand.

The fjord empties into the Skagerrak at Meholmen near Ulvøysund, which is considered to be the western starting point of the Blindleia strait. Blindleia is the inner shipping route along the coast of Lillesand.  The smaller Isefjærfjorden is a branch off the main Kvåsefjorden.  Kvåsefjorden can sometimes be harsh and difficult to cross with small boats, because it is wide open to the Skagerrak and there is no archipelago to protect it unlike in the nearby Blindleia.

References 

Fjords of Agder
Lillesand
Geography of Kristiansand